Blue Star Ltd is an Indian multinational home appliances company, headquartered in Mumbai. It specializes in air conditioning, commercial refrigeration and MEP (mechanical, electrical, plumbing and firefighting).  It is the country's second largest homegrown player in the air conditioning space.

History 

Blue Star was founded in 1943 by Mohan T Advani as a reconditioning company. Soon after inception, Blue Star ventured into the manufacturing of ice candy machines and bottle coolers and began the design and execution of central air conditioning projects, followed by the manufacturing of water coolers. The company later expanded into new product lines and began exporting to Dubai. It went public in 1969 with an initial public offering, listing on the Bombay Stock Exchange. In the late 2000s, Blue Star ventured into the electrical, plumbing and fire-fighting contracting businesses, offering customers an integrated mechanical, electrical, and plumbing (MEP) solution. It then forayed into the residential air conditioning segment a few years later, along with entering the water and air purification segments as well as the engineering facility management (EFM) space recently.

Manufacturing and operations

Blue Star has four manufacturing plants, which are located in Dadra, Kala Amb, Wada, and Ahmedabad. In addition, the company is currently in the process of setting up a plant in Sri City.

Blue Star has a presence in 18 countries in the Middle East, Africa, SAARC and ASEAN regions. Blue Star has three Joint Ventures in Oman, Qatar and Malaysia. The company has subsidiaries in UAE, Qatar and India. The company serves the Middle East market via its UAE subsidiary. The company's subsidiary in India is called Blue Star Engineering & Electronics Ltd

References

External links
 

Companies based in Mumbai
Engineering companies of India
Indian brands
Indian companies established in 1943
Companies listed on the National Stock Exchange of India
Companies listed on the Bombay Stock Exchange
Home appliance manufacturers of India